The Duckwater pyrg, scientific name Pyrgulopsis aloba, is a species of freshwater snail in the family Hydrobiidae. It is endemic to the United States and only known from two springs in the Duckwater Reservation, Nye County, Nevada.

References

Pyrgulopsis
Molluscs of the United States
Endemic fauna of Nevada
Freshwater animals of North America
Gastropods described in 1998
Taxonomy articles created by Polbot